Alisher Uzoqov (sometimes spelled Alisher Uzakov in English) (born August 25, 1984) is an Uzbek actor, film director, singer, and professional footballer. Uzoqov received widespread recognition and acclaim in Uzbekistan after starring in the 2009 Uzbek drama Janob hech kim (Mr. Nobody). Since then he has starred in many Uzbek comedy films. Uzoqov has also recorded a few songs.

Uzoqov has also tried his hand at directing. He has directed three films, namely, Mening akam boʻydoq! (My Brother is a Bachelor!) (2011), Endi dadam boʻydoq? (Now My Father is a Bachelor?) (2012), and Kuzda gullagan daraxt (The Tree That Blossomed in the Fall) (2015). In 2013, the actor announced his plans to quit acting, but has appeared in several films since.

Since 2012, Uzoqov has played for Istiqlol Football Club which competes in the Uzbekistan First League. In 2016, he became vice president of the Andijan Province Football Federation.

Life 
Alisher Uzoqov was born on August 25, 1984, in Tashkent, Uzbek SSR, USSR. He is a grandson of the celebrated Uzbek folk singer Maʼmurjon Uzoqov. His father, Muhammadjon Uzoqov, is a singer and actor. His mother, Shohida Uzoqova, is also a movie actress and has appeared alongside Uzoqov in several films, most notably in Soʻnggi lahza (The Last Moment) (2009), Tundan tonggacha (From Dusk to Dawn) (2009), Mening akam boʻydoq! (My Brother is a Bachelor!) (2011), Uchrashuv (The Meeting) (2011), Soʻnggi qoʻngʻiroq (The Last Bell) (2012), and Tundan tonggacha davom etadi... (From Dusk to Dawn Continues...) (2012).  Uzoqov is married and has a son (Firdavs 2012) and a daughter (Soliha 2014).

Filmography

Actor

Music video appearances

Director

Television

Screenwriter

Awards 
Although he does not have more awards, most people enjoy his starring films and appreciate his acting talent.

Discography

Music videos

Football career 
Since 2012, Uzoqov has played for Istiqlol Football Club which competes in the Uzbekistan First League. In 2016, he became vice president of the Andijan Province Football Federation.

References

External links

1984 births
Uzbeks
Living people
Uzbekistani male film actors
21st-century Uzbekistani male singers
21st-century Uzbekistani male actors
Uzbekistani footballers
Association footballers not categorized by position